The 2009 Vuelta a Burgos was the 31st edition of the Vuelta a Burgos road cycling stage race, which was held from 5 August to 9 August 2009. The race was won by Alejandro Valverde of the  team.

General classification

References

Vuelta a Burgos
2009 in road cycling
2009 in Spanish sport